Mount Rogers may refer to:

 Mount Rogers, highest point in Virginia, USA
 Mount Rogers (Antarctica)
 Mount Rogers (British Columbia) in British Columbia, Canada
 Mount Rogers (Washington) in Washington, USA
 Mount Rogers (Australian Capital Territory), a hill in the Australian Capital Territory
 Mount Rogers Health District, a health district composed of five counties in Southwest Virginia

See also
 Rogers Peak, Oregon, USA